The 1983 World Junior Curling Championships were held from March 13 to 19 at the Medicine Hat Arena in Medicine Hat, Alberta, Canada. The tournament only consisted of a men's event.

Teams

Round robin

  Teams to playoffs
  Teams to tiebreaker

Tiebreaker

Playoffs

Final standings

Awards
 WJCC Sportsmanship Award:  Mike Hay

All-Star Team:
Skip:  John Base
Third:  Niclas Järund
Second:  Stig-Arne Gunnestad
Lead:  Dana Westemeier

References

External links

World Junior Curling Championships
Curling competitions in Alberta
World Junior Championships
World Junior Curling Championships
Sport in Medicine Hat
International curling competitions hosted by Canada
World Junior Curling Championships
World Junior Curling Championships